Champaign Central High School is a high school located in Champaign, Illinois. It has 1,385 students in grades 9-12. The principal is Joe Williams. It is part of the Champaign Unit 4 School District school system. Its sports teams are the Central Maroons.

History 
Champaign High School, now Champaign Central High School, began serving the public in 1870. The present school site, 610 W. University Avenue, was donated by J.P. White to the public schools of Champaign in 1868 and has housed Central High School since 1956. During the 1963-64 school year, due to over-crowding approximately 300 students were assigned on a half-day basis to Jefferson Middle School. These students attended three academic classes at Jefferson plus three classes at the senior high school. During the 1965-66 school year, approximately 550 sophomores attended classes in the first phase of the Senior High School Annex. They attended classes on the same schedule as those at Champaign High School. The 1966-67 school year found an equal distribution of sophomore and junior students at both Champaign Senior High School and the Annex. So in 1968-69, the Champaign Board of Education officially established two district high schools, Central and Centennial. On April 1, 1997, the taxpayers of Champaign approved a bond issue that included an addition and extensive remodeling to Central High School. The main features of the new addition and remodeling were a large modern media center, a child development/day care center, foods laboratory, an expanded student services area, and three large state of the art biological science laboratories. An open house and dedication of the new facilities was held on September 13, 1998. Central's mascot is a maroon bear, Max Maroon, and the school colors are maroon and white.

In 2011, the Champaign school board began looking into replacing Champaign Central High School, citing concerns over the school's current facilities. Central has shared Centennial High School's football, softball, and soccer fields since the 1960s.

Athletics

Notable alumni

Alison Krauss, musical artist (attended, did not graduate)
Bill Geist, TV journalist, CBS Sunday Morning
Bob Richards, two-time Olympic gold medalist in pole vault
J Leman, football player
Somi (Laura Kakoma), singer
Yvonne Suhor, actress
Tyler McGill, Olympic gold medalist swimmer
Rod Fletcher, All-American college basketball player                     
Todd Peat,  football player
Jordan Caroline, Basketball Player

References

External links 
Champaign Central High School Official Site

Public high schools in Illinois
Buildings and structures in Champaign, Illinois
Schools in Champaign County, Illinois
Educational institutions established in 1866
1866 establishments in Illinois